Elasmosoma is a genus of insects belonging to the family Braconidae.

The species of this genus are found in the Northern Hemisphere.

Selected species
 Elasmosoma bakeri Ashmead, 1895 
 Elasmosoma berolinense Ruthe, 1858 
 Elasmosoma calcaratum Tobias, 1986 
 Elasmosoma depressum van Achterberg & Koponen, 2003 
 Elasmosoma luxemburgense Wasmann, 1909 
 Elasmosoma michaeli Shaw, 2007 
 Elasmosoma obscuripennis (He, Chen & van Achterberg, 1997) 
 Elasmosoma pallidipennis (He, Chen & van Achterberg, 1997) 
 Elasmosoma pergandei Ashmead, 1895 
 Elasmosoma petulans Muesebeck 1941 
 Elasmosoma schwarzi Ashmead, 1895 
 Elasmosoma taiwanense Chou, 1985 
 Elasmosoma trichopygidium Belokobylskij, 2000 
 Elasmosoma vigilans Cockerell, 1909

References

Braconidae
Braconidae genera